HNLMS Walrus (S802) is a  of the Royal Netherlands Navy. After a long delay following a serious fire during construction, the submarine entered service in 1992. Walrus has been deployed both for naval exercises and in combat operations around the world. The submarine is currently in active service.

Ship history
Walrus was laid down on 11 October 1979 at the Rotterdamsche Droogdok Maatschappij ("Rotterdam Dry Dock Company") yard in Rotterdam. She was launched on 28 October 1985, but on 14 August 1986 an electrical fire broke out on board causing damage costing ƒ225 million(€100 million) to repair. Her completion was delayed until 13 September 1989. Sea trials were carried out in 1990 and 1991, and the submarine was commissioned on 25 March 1992.

As part of the Netherlands contribution to NATO, Walrus took part in various joint exercises, including Submarine Rescue Exercise "Sorbet Royal 96" and "Northern Light 99". During the multi-national "Joint Task Force Exercise/Theatre Missile Defence Initiative 1999" (JTFEX/TMDI99) Walrus successfully penetrated the U.S. Navy screen and "sank" several ships, including the aircraft carrier  before escaping.

In 2000 she participated in a British Flag Officer Sea Training exercise, and in "Linked Seas 2000", a naval control of shipping exercise in the North Atlantic. In September 2000 all four Walrus-class boats were withdrawn from service after micro-fractures and corrosion was detected in the diesel engine exhaust valves. After replacement valves were fitted Walrus returned to active service in early 2001. From September to December 2002 Walrus took part in "Operation Enduring Freedom", acting as an COMINT intelligence gathering post in the Arabian Sea and the Persian Gulf.

In 2007 she took part in exercises in the Caribbean Sea with special forces of the Netherlands Marine Corps.

In 2008 it was announced the Netherlands will spend up to 100 million euros ($155 million) on a programme to upgrade all four Walrus-class submarines. These improvements will keep them operational until at least 2025.

On 13 May 2013 Dutch Ministerie van Defensie signed a contract worth EUR94 million (USD120.3 million) with Imtech Marine Netherlands to begin the life-extension programme for the four Walrus-class boats. Walrus will be the last of the class to undergo refit and upgrade and is scheduled to return to operational service in 2019.

References

Sources

External links 

 Homepage of Hr. Ms. Walrus (in Dutch)

Walrus-class submarines
Ships built in Rotterdam
1985 ships
1989 ships
Submarines of the Netherlands